Ripperger is a surname. Notable people with the surname include:
 Chad Ripperger (born 1964), American Catholic theologian and philosopher
 Mark Ripperger (born 1980), American baseball umpire
 Rockwell Ryan Ripperger, singer-songwriter
  (1928–1975), German actor